

Table

India vs Syria

Maldives vs Nepal

Syria vs Cameroon

India vs Maldives

Nepal vs Cameroon

Maldives vs Syria

India vs Nepal

Cameroon vs Maldives

Syria vs Nepal

India vs Cameroon

Group Stage